Amphithasus truncatus is a species of beetle in the family Carabidae, the only species in the genus Amphithasus.

References

Lebiinae